Bengt Fröman is a retired male badminton player of Sweden noted for his doubles play. He won the prestigious All-England men's doubles title in 1976 and the bronze medal at the 1977 World Championships in men's doubles both in partnership with Thomas Kihlström.

Achievements

World Championships 
Men's doubles

European Championships 
Men's doubles

International tournaments 
Men's doubles

References

Swedish male badminton players
Living people
1950 births